Austin Robert Loughnan (15 June 1851 – 9 October 1926) was an Australian sportsman who played five first-class cricket matches for Victoria between 1871 and 1875 and played Australian rules football for Melbourne Football Club in the Victorian Football Association (VFA).

See also
 List of Victoria first-class cricketers

References

1851 births
1926 deaths
Australian cricketers
Victoria cricketers
Cricketers from Hobart
Australian rules footballers from Tasmania
Melbourne Cricket Club cricketers
Melbourne Football Club (pre-VFA) players